Vinod Kannan is an Indian businessman. He is the CEO of Vistara Airlines.

Early life and education
Kannan did a master's degree in Business Administration from the National University of Singapore and University of California, Los Angeles.

Career
Kannan had worked with Singapore Airlines (SIA) for over twenty years. In June 2019, he joined Vistara as the Chief Strategy Officer. In January 2020, he became the Chief Commercial Officer of Vistara. In January 2022, he has become the controversial chief executive officer of Vistara.
One month after taking over as Vistara CEO Kannan apologised for falling standards. In a widely circulated email, he said, "Knowing that you have been inconvenienced and disappointed with our services has been heartbreaking for me and the entire Vistara family." Nothing has changed with passengers constantly complaining about rude and difficult-to-access customer relations staff.

References

Living people
Indian businesspeople
20th-century Indian businesspeople
National University of Singapore alumni
University of California, Los Angeles alumni
Year of birth missing (living people)